Nix or NIX may refer to:

Places
 Nix, Alabama, an unincorporated community, United States
 Nix, Texas, a ghost town in southwestern Lampasas County, Texas, United States
 Nix (moon), a moon of Pluto

People
 Nix (surname), listing people with the surname

In science and technology
 Nix (gene), a pro-apoptotic gene
 Norwegian Internet Exchange (NIX), an Internet exchange point in Oslo
 Neutral Internet Exchange of the Czech Republic, the Internet exchange point in Prague
 Nix package manager, a "purely functional" package and configuration manager for computer systems
 Unix-like, abbreviated *nix or nix

Codes
 Nioro Airport, Mali (IATA airport code: NIX)
 Hema language, (ISO 639-3 code: nix)

Other uses
 Nix Federal Building, a historic building in Philadelphia, Pennsylvania
 Nix Professional Building, a hospital in San Antonio, Texas
 Permethrin, branded as Nix in North America, an anti-lice drug
 "Nix", a song by Golden Boy with Miss Kittin from Or
 The Nix, a 2017 novel by Nathan Hill
 Neck (water spirit) or nix, an aquatic being in Germanic folklore

See also
 
 Nyx (disambiguation)
 Nixe (disambiguation)
 Nick (disambiguation)
 NIC (disambiguation)
 New York Knicks, basketball team